Shellbrook  may refer to:
Shellbrook, Leicestershire, England
Rural Municipality of Shellbrook No. 493, Saskatchewan, Canada
Shellbrook, Saskatchewan, Canada
Shellbrook Airport
Shell Brook, a river in Saskatchewan, Canada